Sri Lanka participated at the 2017 Summer Universiade which was held in Taipei, Taiwan.

Sri Lanka sent a delegation consisting of 67 competitors for the event competing in 7 different sports.

Sri Lanka didn't win any medal in the multi-sport event.

Participants

References

External links 
official website

Sri Lanka at the Summer Universiade
Nations at the 2017 Summer Universiade
2017 in Sri Lankan sport